Hamirgarh railway station is a railway station in Bhilwara district, Rajasthan. Its code is HMG. It serves Hamirgarh town. The station consists of 2 platforms. Passenger, Express trains halt here.

References

Railway stations in Bhilwara district
Ajmer railway division